The Rest on the Flight into Egypt is a subject in Christian art, and may refer to:

 Rest on the Flight into Egypt (Algardi) (c. 1640)
 Rest on the Flight into Egypt (Annibale Carracci) (c. 1604)
 Rest on the Flight into Egypt (Bordone) (c. 1530)
 Rest on the Flight into Egypt (Caravaggio) (c. 1597)
 Rest on the Flight into Egypt (Cima) (1496–1498)
 Rest on the Flight into Egypt (David, Antwerp) (c. 1515)
 Rest on the Flight into Egypt (David, Lisbon) (c. 1501–1520)
 Rest on the Flight into Egypt (David, Madrid) (c. 1515)
 Rest on the Flight into Egypt (David, New York) (c. 1515)
 Rest on the Flight into Egypt (David, Washington) (c. 1510)
 Rest on the Flight into Egypt (Mola) (c. 1640s)
 Rest on the Flight into Egypt (Murillo) (1665)
 Rest on the Flight into Egypt (Parmigianino), or Nativity (1665)
 Rest on the Flight into Egypt (Patinir) (c. 1515)
 Rest on the Flight into Egypt (Titian) (c. 1512)
 Rest on the Flight into Egypt (van Dyck) (1630)

See also
 Rest on the Flight to Egypt with Saint Francis, by Correggio (c. 1520)
 Flight into Egypt (disambiguation)
 Landscape with the Flight into Egypt (disambiguation)